Mixed is the past tense of mix. 

Mixed may refer to:

 Mixed (United Kingdom ethnicity category), an ethnicity category that has been used by the United Kingdom's Office for National Statistics since the 1991 Census
 Mixed (album), a compilation album of two avant-garde jazz sessions featuring performances by the Cecil Taylor Unit and the Roswell Rudd Sextet

See also
 Mix (disambiguation)
 Mixed breed, an animal whose parents are from different breeds or species
 Mixed ethnicity, a person who is of multiple races